This is a list of battalions of the Royal Scots, which existed as an infantry regiment of the British Army from 1633 to 2006.

Original composition
In 1881, under the Cardwell-Childers reforms of the British Armed Forces, one pre-existent militia and seven volunteer battalions of Edinburgh, Midlothian, Berwickshire, Haddingtonshire and Linlithgowshire were integrated into the structure of the Royal Scots. Volunteer battalions had been created in reaction to a perceived threat of invasion by France in the late 1850s. Organised as "rifle volunteer corps", they were independent of the British Army and composed primarily of the middle class. The only change to the regiment's structure during the period of 1881–1908, was the loss of the 1st Berwickshire Rifle Volunteer Corps, and the numbering of the remaining Rifle Volunteer Corps into Volunteer Battalions.

Reorganisation

The Territorial Force (later Territorial Army) was formed in 1908, which the volunteer battalions joined, while the militia battalions transferred to the "Special Reserve". All volunteer battalions were renumbered to create a single sequential order.

First World War

The Royal Scots fielded 35 battalions and lost 11,213 officers and other ranks during the course of the war. The regiment's territorial components formed duplicate second and third line battalions. As an example, the battalions of the 4th King's were numbered as the 1/4th, 2/4th, and 3/4th respectively. Many battalions of the Royal Scots were formed as part of Secretary of State for War Lord Kitchener's appeal for an initial 100,000 men volunteers in 1914. They were referred to as the New Army or Kitchener's Army. The 15th to 18th King's, New Army "Service" battalions, were referred to as the "Pals" because they were predominantly composed of colleagues. The Volunteer Training Corps were raised with overage or reserved occupation men early in the war, and were initially self-organised into many small corps, with a wide variety of names. Recognition of the corps by the authorities brought regulation and as the war continued the small corps were formed into battalion sized units of the county Volunteer Regiment. In 1918 these were linked to county regiments.

Inter-War
By 1922, all of the regiment's war-raised battalions had disbanded. The King's Regiment did not, however, return to its original peacetime size; it lost many of its territorial battalions shortly after the war ended. The Special Reserve reverted to its militia designation in 1921, then to the Supplementary Reserve in 1924; however, its battalions were effectively placed in 'suspended animation'. As World War II approached, the Territorial Army was reorganised in the mid-1930s, many of its infantry battalions were converted to other roles, especially anti-aircraft.

Second World War
The Royal Scots expansion during the Second World War was modest compared to 1914–1918. National Defence Companies were combined to create a new "Home Defence" battalion. In addition 17 battalions of the Home Guard were affiliated to the regiment, wearing its cap badge, and also by 1944 two batteries of [Anti-Aircraft] rocket batteries (Z Battery. A Light Anti-Aircraft (LAA) troop was formed from one of the local battalions to defend a power station. Due to the daytime (or shift working) occupations of the men in the LAA troops, the troops required eight times the manpower of an equivalent regular unit.

Post-World War II

In the immediate post-war period, the army was significantly reduced: nearly all infantry regiments had their first and second battalions amalgamated and the Supplementary Reserve disbanded.

References

Royal Scots
Royal Scots, List of battalions
Royal Scots
Royal Scots
Battalions

Bibliography